The Waihemo by-election was a by-election in the New Zealand electorate of Waihemo, a rural seat in Otago, in the South Island.

Background
The by-election was held on 18 July 1900, and was precipitated by the resignation of sitting MP, John McKenzie. The seat was won by fellow Liberal Thomas Mackenzie. Mackenzie was an advocate of the Otago province and campaigned to stop the region's declining situation compared to the rest of New Zealand. His sole opponent was William Guffie, a local councilor from Mount Ida.

Results
The following table gives the election results:

References

Waihemo 1900
1900 elections in New Zealand
Politics of Otago